Naulakha Haar is a 1953 Bollywood drama film produced by Ratnadeep Pictures and directed by Bal Chander Shuckla & Harsukh Bhatt. Bhola Srestha was the music director of this movie.

Plot 
Devla (Durga Khote) is married in a prominent Rajput family located in Mandavgar. Her sister is also married in this family. Their brother, Mahil Rai Podiyal (Jeevan (actor)), is bitter about this and plots with Kiriya Rai, which results in Kiriya's vain attempt to steal a valuable necklace, losing his reputation and his sword. Thus humiliated he returns, plots his vengeance, returns, kills Devla's and her sister's husbands, steals the necklace, sets fire to Mandavgar, takes an elephant and a magical flying horse with him, and hangs the scalps of his victims on the doorway to his palace. Devla swears to avenge this humiliation. Now 19 years later, Devla's son, Udal (Arvind), has grown up and is told about his past. He decides to kill Kiriya, but finds out that he is Bijma's, the woman he loves, brother. Kiriya finds out about this and forbids Bijma (Meena Kumari) from seeing him again. Nevertheless, Udal sneaks into Bijma's, who is learning magic, room. When Kiriya knocks on the door, Bijma magically transforms Udal into a parrot, but Kiriya wrings its neck and tosses it from the balcony. With Udal's neck wrung, how will Devla carry out her vengeance?

Cast
 Meena Kumari as Bijma
 Durga Khote as Devla
 Nirupa Roy as Lakha
 Jeevan as Mahil
 Ishwarlal as Kiriya
 Arvind as Udal
 Sunder as Dheva

Crew
Director – Harsukh Jagneshwar Bhatt & Bal Chander Shuckla
Producer – Ratnadeep Pictures
Story – Pt. Anuj Bhaskerji	
Dialogues & Screenplay – Pt. Girish
Photography	– K. Purushottam & Arvind Desai
Music – Bhola Srestha
Lyrics – Bharat Vyas & Ramesh Gupta
Editing – Thakore Desai
Playback Singers –Shamshad Begum, Kishore Kumar, Asha Bhosle, Rajkumari Dubey, Pramodini Desai, Arvind, Sunder, Gandhari, Madhubala Jhaveri

Soundtrack

Lyrics for the songs of the film were written by Bharat Vyas & Ramesh Gupta. Bhola Srestha was gave the music.

External links

References

1950s Hindi-language films
Indian black-and-white films
Indian drama films
1953 films